Sayyid ul Sadaat Sayyid Mir Jan Shah Saheb ibn Sayyid Mir Hasan Naqshbandi (born in Kabul, Afghanistan in year 1800, died in year 1901 in Lahore) is a Sunni Sufi saint from Kabul.

Ancestry 
Sayyid Mir Jan was a Sayyid (a descendant of Muhammad through his daughter Fatimah and his cousin Ali ibn Abi Talib), both maternally and paternally. Among his paternal ancestors were seven of the Twelve Imams, and among his maternal ancestors were eleven of the Twelve Imams and Sayyid Bahauddin Naqshband, Sayyid Alauddin Atar, and Khwaja Khawand Mahmud (also known as Hazrat Ishaan). After the Battle of Karbala, the Ahl al-Bayt went back to Medina. From there Musa al Kazim was forced to go to Iraq. One of the descendants of Musa al-Kazim was called Khwaja Sayyid Mir Ismail Muhammad Hakim. One son of Khwaja Sayyid Mir ismail Muhammad Hakim was Khwaja Sayyid Mir Latif, an ancestor of Sayyid Mir Jan. The descendants of Sayyid Mir Latif immigrated to Bokhara and after that to Kabul, where Sayyid Mir Jan was born. Sayyid Mir Jans maternal ancestors were Askari Sayyids, i.e. descendants of Imam Hasan al-Askari. His son was Sayyid Ali Akbar. His existence was hidden, because of political conflicts. Sayyid Ali Akbars descendants also migrated to Bokhara, where the prominent Sufi saint Bahauddin Naqshband, founder of the Naqshbandi Sufi Order, was born. A descendant of Bahauddin Naqshband after 7 generations was Hazrat Ishaan, whose descendants later immigrated to variable regions of South Asia, like Khorasan, today known as Afghanistan in order to spread the Ishaqiyya Naqshbandiyya branch's teachings.

Biography

Family 
Sayyid Mir Jan was a son of Sayyid Mir Hasan. Both his brothers
chief justice Khwaja Sayyid Mir Fazlullah and Sayyid Mir Mahmud are regarded as saints as well. His younger brother Sayyid Mahmud Agha was his disciple, becoming a qutb one rank below Sayyid Mir Jan. Other siblings included two brothers named Sayyid Mir Azimullah and Khwaja Sayyid Mir Taqiqullah, and five sisters. Sayyid Mir Jan married his wife in Medinah, and had 2 sons. His wife and his sons died during a natural disaster.

Early life and education 
Sayyid Mir Jan was introduced in Tasawuf in the age of 5 years. His father Sayyid Mir Hasan was also a high ranking saint, who used to teach his sons about Islam and Sufism. Sayyid Mir Jan was educated in Kabul and became a professor of Islamic theology. Later he has built his own university in Lahore. Sayyid Mir Jan and his brother Sayyid Mahmud also wrote poems.

Spiritual journey 
After his education in Kabul, Sayyid Mir Jan went on a spiritual journey and became the successor to many Sufi Saints who had trained him in Sufism. Sayyid Mir Jan Shah Saheb became khalifa (master) of 7 Sufi tariqats, including tariqats of the Naqshbandi, Qadiriyya, Chishtiyya, Suhrawardiyya, Qalandariyya, Kubrawiyya, and Madariyya orders. He stayed in Medina for a decade to be trained by one of his masters, and while there married a local woman. Later, he traveled to Lahore to the tomb of Hazrat Khwaja Khawand Mahmud, also known as Hazrat Ishaan. Hazrat Ishaan was a Sufi saint from Bukhara, whose wilayat was also in Lahore. Hazrat Ishaan's successors included his two sons Moinuddin Naqshband in Srinagar, Kashmir and Bahauddin in Lahore and their descendants until the late 18th century, by which time the lineage was lost. According to a legend, Hazrat Ishaan made prophecies about Sayyid Mir Jan, naming him as his successor to revive his lineage.

Spiritual rank and legacy 

Sayyid Mir Jan was Qutb, the highest ranking Wali Allah (saint) of his time. In Sufism the Qutb is known as the cosmic leader of the whole universe and righteous successor of Muhammad. His line of succession is claimed by his followers to be the only legitimate line for the next Qutb after him.

Legacy 
In honor Hazrat Ishaan, Dakik Family also known as the House of Hazrat Ishaan are continuing his legacy. The Dakik Family are biological descendants of Hazrat Ishaan. Sayyid Mir Jan belongs to this family and is the granduncle of the family´s matriarch, that married with a Prince of the Afghan Royal Family, acting as UN Ambassador.

Colateral Descendants 
As Sayyid Mir Jan´s children died young, his bloodline continues colaterally through the direct descendants of his brother Sayyid Mir Fazlullah Agha:

 1. His Serene Highness Sayyid Mir Sharif, died in his youth and left no children

 2.His Serene Highness Sayyid Mir Muhammad Jan (1900-1955), Sufi Saint and high officer in the Kingdom of Afghanistan

 a)HRH Princess Sayyida Bibi Rahima Begum daughter of Sayyid Mir Muhammad Jan, successor based on the will of her father, female Wali, matriarch of Dakik Family

  aa)HRH Sultan Masood Dakik (b.1967), son of Sayyida Bibi Rahima, Afghan 
     Barakzai Prince, lobbyist, entrepreneur, philanthropist, married his cousin Bibi Sayyida Nargis Begum 
     daughter of Sayyid Mir Assadullah, son of Sayyid Mir Muhammad Jan. Both live in Germany and have three children:

   aaa)HRH Prince Sayyid Raphael Dakik (b. 1998), Lawyer and honorary Diplomat
   bbb)HRH Prince Sayyid Matin Dakik (b.2000), Economy expert   
   ccc)HRH Prince Sayyid Hamid Dakik (b. 2002)]], Engineering expert

Bloodline to Prophet Muhammad 

 1 Muhammad
 2 Ali and Fatima Al Zahra
 3 Imam Hussain Shaheede Reza
 4 Imam Ali Zayn al-Abidin
 5 Imam Muhammad al Baqir
 6 Imam Ja'far al-Sadiq
 7 Imam Musa al Kazim
 8 Abu Qasim Sayyid Mir Hamza
 9 Sayyid Mir Qasim
 10 Sayyid Mir Ahmad
 11 Sayyid Mir Muhammad
 12 Ismail Muhammad Hakim
 13 Sayyid Mir Latif
 14 Sayyid Mir Muhammad
 15 Sayyid Mir Kulal
 16 Sayyid Mir Ahmad
 17 Sayyid Mir Hashim
 18 Sayyid Mir Mustaali
 19 Sayyid Mir Dost Ali
 20 Sayyid Mir Muhammad Latif
 21 Sayyid Mir Abdullah
 22 Sayyid Mir Muhammad Shamah
 23 Sayyid Mir Latifullah
 24 Sayyid Mir Ruhollah
 25 Sayyid Mir Baitullah
 26 Sayyid Mir Nimatullah
 27 Sayyid Mir Azimullah
 28 Sayyid Mir Muhammad Hasan
 29 Sayyid Mir Jan, brother of Sayyid Mir Fazlullah Agha
Colateral Descendants (children of his brother Sayyid Mir Fazlullah):
 30 Sayyid Mir Muhammad Jan
 31 Sayyida Rahima Dakik
 32 Sultan Masood Dakik
 33 Sayyid Raphael Dakik, Sayyid Matin Dakik and Sayyid Hamid Dakik

See also 
Abdul Qadir Jilani
Ali Hujwiri
Sayyid Badiuddin Madar
Mir Sayyid Ali Hamadani 
Bahauddin Naqshband
Moinuddin Chishti
Hazrat Ishaan
Sayyid Moinuddin Hadi Naqshband
Ziyarat Naqshband Sahab
Sayyid Mahmud Agha
Sayyid Mir Fazlullah Agha
Sultan Masood Dakik

References 

19th-century Muslim theologians
Family of Muhammad
Hashemite people
Naqshbandi order
1800 births
1901 deaths
Sufi mystics
Sufi poets
Islam in Kabul
People from Kabul
Afghan people of Arab descent